The Cunene (Portuguese spelling) or Kunene (common Namibian spelling) is a river in Southern Africa. It flows from the Angola highlands south to the border with Namibia. It then flows west along the border until it reaches the Atlantic Ocean. It is one of the few perennial rivers in the region. Its mean annual discharge is 174 m3/s (6,145 cfs) at its mouth.
The Epupa Falls lie on the river. Olushandja Dam dams a tributary of the river, the Etaka, and helps provide the Ruacana Power Station with water.

Dam controversies 
The Namibian government proposed in the late 1990s to build the Epupa Dam, a controversial hydroelectric dam on the Cunene.  In 2012 the Governments of Namibia and Angola announced plans to jointly build the Orokawe dam in the Baynes Mountains. According to the indigenous Himba who would have been most affected by the construction of the dam, the dam threatens the local ecosystem and therefore the economic basis of the Himba. During February 2012, traditional Himba chiefs issued a declaration to the African Union and to the United Nations Human Rights Council of the United Nations, titled "Declaration of the most affected Ovahimba, Ovatwa, Ovatjimba and Ovazemba against the Orokawe Dam in the Baynes Mountains," which outlines the fierce objections against the dam from the traditional Himba chiefs and communities that reside near the Kunene River.

In September 2012, the United Nations special rapporteur on the Rights of Indigenous Peoples visited the Himba, and heard their concerns.

On November 23, 2012, hundreds of Himba and Zemba from Omuhonga and Epupa region protested in Okanguati against Namibia's plans to construct a dam in the Kunene River in the Baynes Mountains, against increasing mining operations on their traditional land and human rights violations against them.

On March 25, 2013, over a thousand Himba and Zemba people marched in Opuwo to protest again against Namibia's plans to build the Orokawe dam in the Baynes Mountains at the Cunene River without consulting with the indigenous peoples that do not consent to the construction plans.

Attraction 
Tourists frequent campsites or lodges in Epupa which offer water sports on the river including rafting and canoeing. There are ancient baobab trees alongside the gorge, and there is an attractive and well-kept viewpoint high above the village and falls, but both are spoiled by broken bottles and abundant garbage.

Notes

References

Sources 
 
 
  Google eBook.

External links 
 Images near Kunene River
 Map of the Cunene River basin at Water Resources eAtlas

Rivers of Angola
Rivers of Namibia
International rivers of Africa
Huambo Province
Geography of Kunene Region
Angola–Namibia border
African drainage basins of the Atlantic Ocean
Border rivers